Eunotia elegans is a species of diatom. It is found in Denmark.

References

 Eunotia elegans at WoRMS

Eunotiales
Species described in 1910